The Howard Plaza Hotel Kaohsiung is a skyscraper hotel completed in 1996 in Sinsing District, Kaohsiung, Taiwan.

The Hotel
The location of the hotel is situated in the Kaohsiung city center, with close proximity to tourist attractions such as Liuhe Night Market and Hong Fa Temple. The five-star hotel has a total of 283 rooms including premium suites, themed restaurants, one café and a bar. It also offers multi-functional conference rooms and private rooms, with a banquet hall with a capacity of 300 people. The hotel also features an outdoor swimming pool, and a splash pool located on the 10th floor with city views as well as a Fitness Center equipped with comprehensive sport facilities and sauna.

Restaurants & Bars 
 Champs-Élysées: Western-style restaurant on the 5th floor offering light meals, grilled beef steak, fried short ribs with a salad bar.
 Yangtse River: Chinese restaurant located on the 6th floor featuring traditional  Shanghai cuisine as well as Roast Duck.
 Pearl River: Chinese restaurant located on the 3rd floor serving Cantonese and Teochew cuisine.
 Smile One Hot Pot Restaurant: Hot pot restaurant located on the 30th floor with views of the city.
 HOVII CAFE: Offers freshly baked pastries and beverages.

Gallery

See also
 Han-Hsien International Hotel
 Kaohsiung Grand Hotel
 Kaohsiung Marriott Hotel

References

External links
Howard Plaza Hotel Kaohsiung Official Website 
Howard Plaza Hotel Kaohsiung - Tourism Bureau of the Ministry of Transport of the Republic of China (Taiwan) 

1996 establishments in Taiwan
Buildings and structures in Kaohsiung
Skyscraper hotels in Kaohsiung
Hotel buildings completed in 1996